Palani was a Lok Sabha constituency in Tamil Nadu. In 2009, after delimitation and redistricting exercise of 2008, Palani constituency was  abolished and has become a part of Dindigul (Lok Sabha constituency) and Karur (Lok Sabha constituency)

Assembly segments
Palani Lok Sabha constituency is composed of the following assembly segments:
Vellakoil (Defunct)
Kangayam (Moved to Erode)
Palani (SC) (Moved to Dindugul)
Oddanchatram (Moved to Dindugul)
Natham (Moved to Dindugul)
Vedasandur (Moved to Dindugul)

Members of the Parliament

Election results

General Election 2004

Election Result 1999

Election Result 1998

Election Result 1996

By-Election 1993

General Election 1991

General Election 1989

General Election 1984

General Election 1980

General Election 1977

See also
 Palani
 List of Constituencies of the Lok Sabha

References

Former Lok Sabha constituencies of Tamil Nadu
Former constituencies of the Lok Sabha
2008 disestablishments in India
Constituencies disestablished in 2008